The Llallagua Formation is a Rhuddanian to Homerian geologic formation of western Bolivia. The formation comprises siliciclastic sediments. The fossil fauna suggests a warm water, nearshore current was active allowing northern hemisphere benthos to exist in the formation.

Fossil content 
The formation has provided the following fossils:

 Atrypa reticularis
 Leptaena rhomboidalis
 Orthostrophia cf. dartae
 Chonetes sp.
 Dalejina sp.
 Dalmanites sp.
 Orthostrophella sp.
 Plectodonta sp.
 Protochonetes sp.
 Syntrophia sp.

See also 
 List of fossiliferous stratigraphic units in Bolivia
 Lipeón Formation

References

Further reading 
 G. Laubacher, A. J. Boucot, and J. Gray. 1982. Additions to Silurian stratigraphy, lithofacies, biogeography and paleontology of Bolivia and southern Peru. Journal of Paleontology 56(5):1138-1170

Geologic formations of Bolivia
Silurian System of South America
Silurian Bolivia
Rhuddanian
Aeronian
Telychian
Sheinwoodian
Homerian
Silurian southern paleotemperate deposits
Paleontology in Bolivia
Geology of Cochabamba Department
Aymaran languages